Santo Domingo is an exclusive Chilean coastal city and commune in San Antonio Province, Valparaíso Region. It was founded as Rocas de Santo Domingo (St. Dominic's Rocks).

Demographics 
Of these, 4,737 (63.9%) lived in urban areas and 2,681 (36.1%) in rural areas. The population grew by 19.3% (1,200 persons) between the 1992 and 2002 censuses.

Administration 
As a commune, Santo Domingo is a third-level administrative division of Chile administered by a municipal council, headed by an alcalde who is directly elected every four years. The 2008-2012 alcalde was Fernando Rodríguez Larraín.

Within the electoral divisions of Chile, Santo Domingo is represented in the Chamber of Deputies by María José Hoffmann (UDI) and Víctor Torres (PDC) as part of the 15th electoral district, (together with San Antonio, Cartagena, El Tabo, El Quisco, Algarrobo and Casablanca). The commune is represented in the Senate by Francisco Chahuán Chahuán (RN) and Ricardo Lagos Weber (PPD) as part of the 6th senatorial constituency (Valparaíso-Coast).

See also 
El Yali National Reserve

References

External links 
  Municipality site

Populated places in San Antonio Province
Communes of Chile
Coasts of Valparaíso Region